The White Desert is a 1922 German silent adventure film directed by Ernst Wendt and starring Carl de Vogt, Eduard von Winterstein, and Nora Swinburne.

Cast

References

Bibliography

External links

1922 films
Films of the Weimar Republic
Films directed by Ernst Wendt
German silent feature films
German black-and-white films
1922 adventure films
German adventure films
Films set in the Arctic
Silent adventure films
1920s German films